Sharon L. Cromer is an American diplomat who has served as the United States ambassador to the Gambia since March 2022.

Early life and education 
Cromer was born in Washington, D.C. She earned a Bachelor of Arts from Barnard College and a Juris Doctor from the Georgetown University Law Center.

Career 
Cromer is a career member of the Senior Foreign Service, with the rank of career minister. She served as the U.S. Agency for International Development (USAID) mission director at the U.S. Embassy in Accra, Ghana; she has had multiple positions here. Previously she was the USAID mission director at the U.S. Embassy in Dar es Salaam, Tanzania and she has also been USAID mission director at the U.S. Embassy in Abuja, Nigeria. Cromer served as senior deputy assistant administrator and acting assistant administrator in the Africa Bureau of USAID ,and also as the deputy assistant administrator of the USAID Management Bureau. In Jakarta, Indonesia, Cromer was a supervisory contracting officer, and then the USAID deputy mission director, at the U.S. Embassy. Cromer has also served as a contracting officer in Senegal, Ivory Coast, and Pakistan.

Cromer has also held several positions in Africa.

United States ambassador to the Gambia 
On June 15, 2021, President Joe Biden nominated Cromer to be the next United States Ambassador to The Gambia. On September 29, 2021, a hearing on her nomination was held before the Senate Foreign Relations Committee. On October 19, 2021, her nomination was reported favorably out of committee. On December 18, 2021, the United States Senate confirmed her nomination by voice vote. 

Cromer was sworn into office on January 22, 2022, and she presented her credentials to President of the Gambia Adama Barrow on March 18, 2022.

References 

Year of birth missing (living people)
Living people
21st-century American diplomats
Ambassadors of the United States to the Gambia
American women diplomats
Barnard College alumni
Georgetown University Law Center alumni
People from Washington, D.C.
United States Foreign Service personnel